|}

The Cheltenham Gold Cup is a Grade 1 National Hunt horse race run on the New Course at Cheltenham Racecourse in England, over a distance of about 3 miles 2½ furlongs (3 miles 2 furlongs and 70 yards, or 5,294 m), and during its running there are 22 fences to be jumped. The race takes place each year during the Cheltenham Festival in March.

The steeplechase, which is open to horses aged five years and over, is the most prestigious of all National Hunt events and it is sometimes referred to as the Blue Riband of jump-racing. Its roll of honour features the names of such chasers as Arkle, Best Mate, Golden Miller, Kauto Star, Denman and Mill House. The Gold Cup is the most valuable non-handicap chase in Britain, and in 2023 it offered a total prize fund of £625,000.

History

Early years
The first horse race known as the Cheltenham Gold Cup took place in July 1819. It was a flat race, and it was contested over 3 miles on Cleeve Hill, which overlooks the present venue. The inaugural winner, Spectre, won a prize of 100 guineas for his owner Mr Bodenham.

The founding of the Cheltenham Gold Cup was an important event in the history of National Hunt racing. In the early 1920s there were very few valuable weight-for-age steeplechases. Apart from the National Hunt Chase at Cheltenham and the Champion Chase at Liverpool all the most important races were handicaps. Some people thought this was not in the best interests of the sport, so the Gold Cup was founded to redress the balance to a certain degree. It is not sure who had the idea for the Gold Cup, but it may have been Mr F.H. Cathcart, the Chairman of the Cheltenham Executive. It took a while for the prestige of the Gold Cup to grow, but it is now regarded as the true championship race for staying chasers.

The Cheltenham Gold Cup was first run as a steeplechase on 12 March 1924, over 3 miles 3 furlongs, for five year olds and upwards, with five year olds carrying 11 st 4 lbs, and the remainder 12 st. The race was covered by Pathe News. A prize of £685 was awarded to the owner of the winning horse. This was considerably less valuable than the National Hunt Chase, which was still regarded as the most important race of the meeting. The weather at Cheltenham for that first Gold Cup was mild and springlike. Among the spectators was the Prince of Wales, a friend of Harry Brown who was riding Conjuror II. There was an exciting finish, with Major E.H. Wyndham's five year old, Red Splash, 5/1, ridden by Dick Rees and trained by Fred Withington, beating Conjuror II by a head, with Gerald L a neck away third. Forewarned, ridden by Jack Anthony, was the 3/1 favourite. Red Splash appeared to have a great future, but he was difficult to train and never again ran in the Gold Cup. 

The event originally took place on what is now the "Old Course" at Cheltenham. In its early years it was overshadowed at the Festival by another race, the National Hunt Chase and was worth less in prize money than the County Handicap Hurdle which had a purse of £1,000.

The Gold Cup was abandoned in 1931 (because of frost) and 1937 (flooding), but the five intervening years saw the emergence of the most successful horse in the event's history. All five races from 1932 to 1936 were won by Golden Miller, who also won the Grand National in 1934.

During World War II, the Gold Cup was cancelled twice, in 1943 and 1944. The first multiple winner in the post-war era was Cottage Rake, who won the three runnings from 1948 to 1950. Cottage Rake was trained in Ireland by Vincent O'Brien, and his successes helped to popularise the Gold Cup, and the Festival itself, with the Irish public.

Modern era
The Gold Cup was switched to the "New Course" in 1959, and this remains the regular track used for the event. In the mid-1960s, the race was dominated by Arkle, who won three consecutive runnings from 1964 to 1966. Such was Arkle's perceived superiority before the last of these victories that he was given a starting price of 1/10 (a £10 bet would have won £1). He remains the shortest-priced winner in the race's history.

The first commercial sponsorship of the race was by Piper Champagne, which began supporting the event in 1972. The Tote (now known as Totesport) became the sponsor in 1980.

The most remarkable feat in the Gold Cup by a trainer came in 1983, when Michael Dickinson was responsible for all of the first five horses to finish – Bregawn, Captain John, Wayward Lad, Silver Buck and Ashley House. The 1986 winner, Dawn Run, is the only horse to have ever won both this race and the leading hurdle event, the Champion Hurdle. One of the most popular horses to win the Gold Cup was Desert Orchid, a grey who won the event in 1989. The following year's running was won by Norton's Coin, whose starting price of 100/1 represents the race's longest ever winning price.

The entire Cheltenham Festival was cancelled in 2001 because of an outbreak of foot-and-mouth disease. A replacement for the Cheltenham Gold Cup, the Gold Trophy Chase, was contested at Sandown in late April, but the Racing Post stated that this "lacked any strength in depth and was no substitute for the Gold Cup". The next three runnings were all won by Best Mate, who is the most recent of the four horses to have won the race three or more times.

In 2009, Kauto Star became the first horse to regain the Gold Cup. He overcame his stablemate and conqueror in 2008, Denman, who had recovered from a heart condition to take his place in the race. Timeform spokesperson Kieran Packman said of Kauto Star's performance, "it is the best Gold Cup-winning figure since the Arkle era in the mid-1960s".

One of the cups, a different one being awarded each year, was reported stolen on 14 July 2010 after a burglary at a home in Wormington, Gloucestershire.

Cheltenham Racecourse announced in September 2018 that it had been reunited with the original Cheltenham Gold Cup trophy, dating back to 1924, and will present it to the winner of the 2019 race. First awarded to five-year-old Red Splash, owned by Major Humphrey Wyndham, trained by Fred Withington and ridden by Dick Rees, it will now be re-introduced as a perpetual trophy, presented to the winning connections of the 2019 race and in future years.

In 2020 the Cheltenham Festival, and the Gold Cup in particular, was blamed for accelerating the spread of Covid-19 in the UK, being one of the last major sporting events to take place before national lockdowns were imposed by the government. In 2021 the Gold Cup was contested behind closed doors, as the rest of the festival was, resulting in a muted atmosphere. In 2022,Rachael Blackmore became the first ever female jockey to ride to victory at the Gold Cup on A Plus Tard, who she'd ridden to second place the previous year.

Records
Most successful horse (5 wins):
 Golden Miller – 1932, 1933, 1934, 1935, 1936

Leading jockey (4 wins):
 Pat Taaffe – Arkle (1964, 1965, 1966), Fort Leney (1968)

Leading trainer (5 wins):
 Tom Dreaper – Prince Regent (1946), Arkle (1964, 1965, 1966), Fort Leney (1968)

Leading owner (7 wins):
 Dorothy Paget – Golden Miller (1932, 1933, 1934, 1935, 1936), Roman Hackle (1940), Mont Tremblant (1952)

Winners
 Amateur jockeys indicated by "Mr".
 Winning mares indicated by †
 Winning trainers based in Great Britain unless indicated (IRE) = Ireland, (FRA) = France

 The race was abandoned in 1931 because of frost, and in 1937 because of flooding.

 It was cancelled in 1943 and 1944 because of World War II.

 The 1957 winner, Linwell, was trained by Ivor Herbert, a well-known racing journalist and so barred from holding a trainer's licence.

 Tied Cottage finished first in 1980, but was subsequently disqualified after testing positive for a banned substance.

 The 2001 running was cancelled due to a foot-and-mouth outbreak. A substitute race at Sandown was won by Marlborough.

Race sponsors
Betfred began sponsoring the Gold Cup in 2012, after the betting company bought the Government-owned Tote in June 2011, but in late 2015 they lost their sponsorship following Jockey Club's and Arena Racing new initiative to not allow bookmaker sponsorships on their tracks that do not offer any contribution to horse racing from their offshore business. Only two weeks later a new sponsorship deal was announced with Timico, an independent internet service provider whose CEO Tim Radford is a horse owner having top chasers like Somersby and Racing Demon associated with his name. Timico also offered an increase of £25,000 to reach a total of £575,000 prize money for the 2016 Gold Cup renewal. It was the first time that the race had been sponsored by a non-bookmaker since the Tote took over from Piper Champagne in 1980. In July 2018 Cheltenham Racecourse announced Magners Irish Cider as the new Cheltenham Gold Cup sponsor until 2021 with a possible extension to 2022. Magners ended their sponsorship early, after the 2020 race, and the 2021 race carried the name of the charity WellChild.  On 24 January 2022 it was announced luxury jeweller Boodles would sponsor the Cheltenham Gold Cup from 2022.

The Cheltenham Gold Cup has had the following sponsors:
No sponsor before 1972
Piper Champagne Cheltenham Gold Cup (1972 – 1979) 
Tote Cheltenham Gold Cup (1980 – 2003)
totesport Cheltenham Gold Cup (2004 – 2011)
Betfred Cheltenham Gold Cup (2012 – 2015)
Timico Cheltenham Gold Cup (2016 – 2018)
Magners Cheltenham Gold Cup (2019–2020)
WellChild Cheltenham Gold Cup (2021)
Boodles Cheltenham Gold Cup (2022-

Further reading
Declan Colley, 2010, When Bobby Met Christy – The Story of Bobby Beasley and a Wayward Horse, Collins Press

See also
 Horseracing in Great Britain
 List of British National Hunt races
 Cheltenham Festival

References

 Racing Post:

 thejockeyclub.co.uk/cheltenhamItalic text – Media information pack (2010).
 horseracinghistory.co.uk – Cheltenham Gold Cup.
 pedigreequery.com – Cheltenham Gold Cup – Cheltenham.
 tbheritage.com – Cheltenham Gold Cup.

External links
 Race Recordings 

 
National Hunt races in Great Britain
Cheltenham Racecourse
National Hunt chases
Gold Cup
Recurring sporting events established in 1924
1924 establishments in England
Annual sporting events in the United Kingdom
March sporting events